LimeLight (commonly stylized as LIMΞLIGHT) is a South Korean girl group with unlimited members formed by 143 Entertainment.

History

Pre-debut activities
Some members have previously been involved in the entertainment industry prior to joining the group. MiU has was a contestant on the reality survival show Girls Planet 999 but did not make it into the final debut lineup. She also appeared in some music videos, and was a model for Popteen. Kim Su-hye was a contestant on the reality survival show My Teenage Girl where she ranked 22nd and did not make it into the final debut lineup. Oh Ga-eun and MiU appeared as models for a magazine pictorial for Alexander Wang and MAPS.

2022–present: Pre-debut album release and official debut
On January 15, 2022, it was announced that MiU has signed a contract with 143 Entertainment, and is expected to debut in their upcoming girl group. On April 15, 2022, it was announced that Kim Su-hye has also signed a contract with 143 Entertainment.

On August 16, 2022, 143 Entertainment announced that the group will be an expandable group with an unlimited amount of members. The group will begin their activities with a pre-debut reality show 'Lululala' and release an EP after the reality show ends. Kang Ye-seo and Sakamoto Mashiro are expected to join the group after the contract expiration of Kep1er.

On September 27, Limelight had an early showcase for their pre-debut EP at Ilji Art Hall in Gangnam, Seoul. On the same day, they released a music video for their first single "Starlight". The music video for their second single "Eye To Eye" was released the next day. On September 29, their self-titled pre-debut EP was released into various music platforms.

The group made their official debut on February 17, 2023, with their EP Love & Happiness. The music video for the lead single "Honestly" which was released early on February 14 featured iKon's Jay, whose group recently signed with their respective agency, and Bang Jae-min.

Members

 MiU
 Suhye
 Gaeun

Discography

Extended plays

Singles

Filmography

Reality shows

Awards and nominations

References

External links

2022 establishments in South Korea
K-pop music groups
Musical groups established in 2022
Musical groups from Seoul
South Korean girl groups